
Urququcha (Quechua urqu male animal; mountain, qucha lake, "male lake", hispanicized spelling Orccococha, Orjococha) is a lake in Peru located in the Apurímac Region, Grau Province, Curpahuasi District. It is situated west of Chinaqucha (Quechua for "female lake"), at the foot of Waman Ch'arpa.

References 

Lakes of Peru
Lakes of Apurímac Region